Oded Fehr (born ) is an Israeli actor based in the United States. He is known for his appearance as Ardeth Bay in the 1999 remake of The Mummy and its sequel The Mummy Returns, as well as Carlos Olivera in Resident Evil: Apocalypse and Resident Evil: Extinction and Todd/Clone Carlos in Resident Evil: Retribution, Faris al-Farik in Sleeper Cell, Antoine Laconte in Deuce Bigalow: Male Gigolo and Deuce Bigalow: European Gigolo, the demon Zankou in the TV series Charmed and Eli Cohn on the TV series V. He also portrayed Eyal Lavin, a Mossad agent on the TV series Covert Affairs, as well as Beau Bronn on the TV series Jane by Design and Mossad Deputy Director Ilan Bodnar on NCIS. Additionally he has been the voice of Osiris in the Destiny 2 video game since its Curse of Osiris expansion in 2017. Since 2020, Fehr has appeared in Star Trek: Discovery as Fleet Admiral Charles Vance.

Early life
Fehr was born in Tel Aviv, Israel, the son of Gila (née Lachmann), a day care supervisor, and Uri/Ury Ernst Fehr, a Jerusalem-born geophysicist and marketing executive. His parents come from European Jewish families. He trained at the Bristol Old Vic Theatre School in England after taking a very brief drama class in Frankfurt, Germany. He served as a soldier in the Israeli Navy from 1989 to 1992 and used to work security for the Israeli airline El Al.

Career

Director Stephen Sommers cast Fehr in the films The Mummy and The Mummy Returns.

Fehr's screen appearances have included the 2001–02 NBC series UC: Undercover, the 2002–03 CBS series Presidio Med, and the 2004 film Resident Evil: Apocalypse (he reprised the role in the sequel, Resident Evil: Extinction). He provided the voice of Doctor Fate in Justice League and its sequel Justice League Unlimited, and played Antoine Laconte, a male prostitute, in Rob Schneider's comedies Deuce Bigalow: Male Gigolo (1999) and Deuce Bigalow: European Gigolo (2005). He also acted in the American hit supernatural series Charmed, where he played the evil demon Zankou, the chief villain in that series' seventh season.

Between 2005–2006 Fehr played Farik on the Showtime series Sleeper Cell.

From 2010 to 2014 he portrayed a recurring character, Mossad Agent Eyal Levin on the TV series Covert Affairs. In 2013, he guest starred in the episode "Shiva" of the 10th season of CBS NCIS as an Israeli Mossad assistant director.

Fehr returned to the fifth installment of the Resident Evil series, Resident Evil: Retribution.  In 2019, Fehr appeared in the CBS drama Blood & Treasure, and began an ongoing role as Admiral Vance in Star Trek: Discovery.

Personal life
Fehr married Rhonda Tollefson, whom he met at a Los Angeles Opera, on December 22, 2000. The couple have three children: son Atticus (born 2003) and daughters, Finley (born 2006) and Azelie.

Filmography

Film

Documentaries

Television

Animated series

Video games

References

External links

1970 births
Living people
Alumni of Bristol Old Vic Theatre School
Israeli expatriate male actors in the United States
Israeli male film actors
Israeli male television actors
Israeli military personnel
Jewish Israeli male actors
People from Tel Aviv